The 1410s BC is a decade which lasted from 1419 BC to 1410 BC.

Events and trends
 1420 BC—Hebrew Exodus from Egypt (one proposed date).
 1420 BC—Incumbent Shahram from Persia declared his kingdom.

Significant people
 Amenhotep II, Pharaoh of Egypt, (1427 BC–1401 BC)